Gareth Richard Sheldon (born 31 January 1980) is a former professional footballer, who last played for Midland Football Combination Division Two side Polesworth, where he played as a striker.

Playing career

Exeter City
On 22 May 2002, Sheldon signed a two-year deal with Third Division side Exeter City.

Kidderminster Harriers
Sheldon's career at Exeter had alerted the attentions of Kidderminster Harriers manager Stuart Watkiss following the club's relegation to the Conference, and on 13 July 2005 they moved to sign him on a free transfer. The move failed to bring out the best in Sheldon, and following a disappointing season and the dismissal of Watkiss, he was released from his contract on 23 June 2006, having made 34 appearances and scored two goals.

Hereford United
He was picked up on the free transfer the same day by newly promoted League Two side Hereford United. However, Sheldon was unable to secure a regular first-team place. He made eight league appearances for the club, scoring once against Mansfield Town, and his contract was terminated by mutual consent on 27 February 2007.

Tamworth
On 16 May 2007, Sheldon signed for Tamworth of the Conference North division for the 2007–08 season. Playing in an advanced left-sided midfield position, he won player-of-the-year honours in an under-achieving side. Towards the end of the season, he was played in a central attacking position and his success here was carried over into Tamworth's encouraging start to the 2008–09 season.

Bolehall Swifts
Following his recovery from his long-term injury, Sheldon joined former Adders manager Daren Fulford at his new club Bolehall Swifts.

References

External links

1980 births
Living people
English footballers
Scunthorpe United F.C. players
Exeter City F.C. players
Kidderminster Harriers F.C. players
Hereford United F.C. players
Halesowen Town F.C. players
Tamworth F.C. players
King's Lynn F.C. players
Atherstone Town F.C. players
Bolehall Swifts F.C. players
Bardon Hill F.C. players
England semi-pro international footballers
Footballers from Birmingham, West Midlands
Association football forwards
East Midlands Counties Football League players